The 2007 NESTEA European Championship Tour (or the 2007 European Beach Volleyball Tour) was the European beach volleyball tour for 2007.

The tour consists of six tournaments with both genders, including the 2007 Championship Final.

Tournaments
Nestea Austrian Masters, in St. Pölten, Austria – 17–20 May 2007
Nestea Russian Masters, in Moscow, Russia – 31 May – 3 June 2007
Nestea German Masters, in Hamburg, Germany – 14–17 June 2007
Nestea Swiss Masters, in Lucerne, Switzerland – 5–8 July 2007
Nestea Dutch Masters, in The Hague, Netherlands – 9–12 August 2007
2007 Nestea European Championship Final, in Valencia, Spain – 23–25 August 2007

Tournament results

Women

Men

Medal table by country

References

 

European
Nestea European Championship Tour